Samuel Mandelbaum (September 20, 1884 – November 20, 1946) was a United States district judge of the United States District Court for the Southern District of New York.

Education and career

Born on September 20, 1884, in the Russian Empire, Mandelbaum received a Bachelor of Laws in 1912 from New York University School of Law and a Master of Laws in 1913 from the same institution. He entered private practice in New York City, New York from 1912 to 1923. He was a member of the New York State Assembly from 1923 to 1932 and a member of the New York State Senate from 1932 to 1936.

Federal judicial service

Mandelbaum was nominated by President Franklin D. Roosevelt on June 15, 1936, to the United States District Court for the Southern District of New York, to a new seat authorized by 49 Stat. 1491. He was confirmed by the United States Senate on June 20, 1936, and received his commission on June 22, 1936. His service terminated on November 20, 1946, due to his death in University Place, New York.

See also
List of Jewish American jurists

References

Sources
 
 .
 .

1884 births
1946 deaths
American people of Russian-Jewish descent
Emigrants from the Russian Empire to the United States
Members of the New York State Assembly
New York (state) state senators
New York University School of Law alumni
Jewish American people in New York (state) politics
Judges of the United States District Court for the Southern District of New York
United States district court judges appointed by Franklin D. Roosevelt
20th-century American Jews
20th-century American judges